Umberto Orsini (born 2 April 1934, in Novara) is an Italian stage, television and film actor.

Born in Novara, Orsini gave up his career as notary to attend the Accademia Nazionale di Arte Drammatica Silvio D'Amico. In the late 1950s, he emerged as a talented stage actor, and in 1960, for the theatrical representation of L'Arialda, he worked for the first time with Luchino Visconti. After a few secondary roles (that include Federico Fellini's La Dolce Vita), Orsini debuted in a leading role in 1962 with the film Il mare, directed by Giuseppe Patroni Griffi. In 1969, he was awarded with the Nastro d'Argento for Best Supporting Actor for his performance in Visconti's The Damned. In 2008, he was nominated to David di Donatello for Best Supporting Actor for his role in Il mattino ha l'oro in bocca.

Selected filmography 

 Marisa la civetta (1957) - Sailor (uncredited)
 La Dolce Vita (1960) - Man in Sunglasses That Helps Nadia Strip (uncredited)
 Love in Rome (1960) - Peppino Barlacchi
 Chiamate 22-22 tenente Sheridan (1960) - Tommy
 Battle of the Worlds (1961) - Dr. Fred Steele
 Caccia all'uomo (1961) - Giovanni Maimonti
 Io bacio... tu baci (1961) - Paolo
 Il giorno più corto (1963) - (uncredited)
 Noche de verano (1963) - Miguel
 Don't Tempt the Devil (1963) - Philliet
 Sweet Skin (1963) - Dancer / Ariane's Dance Partner
 Il mare (1963)
 L'amore e la violenza (1965) - Roberto
 Mademoiselle (1966) - Antonio
  (1966) - Timo
 The Sailor from Gibraltar (1967) - Postcard Vendor
 The Girl and the General (1967) - Pvt. Tarasconi
 Candy (1968) - The Big Guy
 The Damned (1969) - Herbert Thallman
 Interrabang (1969) - Fabrizio
  (1970) - Morelli
 Violent City (1970) - Steve
 Bali (1970) - Carlo Primi
 Roma Bene (1971) - Prince Rubio Marescalli
 Trastevere (1971) - L'attore (scenes deleted)
 Maddalena (1971)
 Shadows Unseen (1972) - Enrico Gagliardi
 César and Rosalie (1972) - Antoine
 I figli chiedono perché (1972) - Father of Michèle
 The Outside Man (1972) - Alex
 Ludwig (1973) - Count Von Holnstein
 La Tosca (1973) - Cesare Angelotti
 The Assassination of Matteotti (1973) - Amerigo Dumini
 Tony Arzenta (1973) - Isnello - Gusto's right-hand man
 Story of a Cloistered Nun (1973) - Diego
 Puzzle (1974) - Daniele
 Verdict (1974) - Le médecin du milieu (uncredited)
 Vincent, François, Paul and the Others (1974) - Jacques
 The Antichrist (1974) - Dr. Marcello Sinibaldi
 Smiling Maniacs (1975) - Erzi
 Emmanuelle 2 (1975) - Jean
 Perdutamente tuo... mi firmo Macaluso Carmelo fu Giuseppe (1976) - Avvocato Vito Buscemi
 A Woman at Her Window (1976) - Rico (Santori)
 Une fille cousue de fil blanc (1977) - Frédéric
 Casanova & Co. (1977) - Count Tiretta
 Gangbuster (1977) - Ing. Farnese
 Beyond Good and Evil (1977) - Bernard Foester
 Goodbye Emmanuelle (1977)  - Jean
 The Fifth Commandment (1978) - Sturmführer Hannacker / Vater Redder
 Little Girl in Blue Velvet (1978) - Fabrizzio Conti
 L'argent des autres (1978) - Blue
 Amo non amo (1979)
 Bionda fragola (1980) 
 Elles n'oublient jamais (1994) - Vienne
 Who Killed Pasolini? (1995) - Altro Magistrato
 The Bride’s Journey (1997) - Don Diego
 Cinque giorni di tempesta (1997)
 Solomon (1997) - Nathan
 L'ospite (1998) - Antonio
 Esther (1999) - Memucan
 Johnny the Partisan (2000) - Pinin
 Love Returns (2004) - Dr. Ambrosini
 The Early Bird Catches the Worm (2008) - Uncle Lino
 Al Confini Della Fandonia: L'uomo che flagellò l'intelletto (2008) - Narrator (voice)

References

External links 
 
 

1934 births
Italian male film actors
Italian male stage actors
Italian male television actors
Living people
People from Novara
Nastro d'Argento winners
20th-century Italian male actors
21st-century Italian male actors
Accademia Nazionale di Arte Drammatica Silvio D'Amico alumni